In mathematical representation theory, the Eisenstein integral is an integral introduced by Harish-Chandra in the representation theory of semisimple Lie groups, analogous to Eisenstein series in the theory of automorphic forms. Harish-Chandra used Eisenstein integrals to decompose the regular representation of a semisimple Lie group into representations induced from parabolic subgroups. Trombi gave a survey of Harish-Chandra's work on this.

Definition

Harish-Chandra defined the Eisenstein integral by

where:
x is an element of a semisimple group G
P = MAN is a cuspidal parabolic subgroup of G
ν is an element of the complexification of a
a is the Lie algebra of A in the Langlands decomposition P = MAN.
K is a maximal compact subgroup of G, with G = KP.
ψ is a cuspidal function on M, satisfying some extra conditions
τ is a finite-dimensional unitary double representation of K
HP(x) = log a where x = kman is the decomposition of x in G = KMAN.

Notes

References

Representation theory